Jason Gavin may refer to:

 Jason Gavin (footballer) (born 1980), Irish football player
 Jason Gavin (writer), television writer